Personal Best is the first studio album by the American queercore band Team Dresch. It was released in January 1995 by both Candy Ass Records and Chainsaw Records.

Recording and release
Personal Best was produced by John Goodmanson and the band and recorded at Avast! in Seattle, Washington, from August 12 to August 16, 1994. As the band's first album, it was released in January 1995 on the singer and guitarist Jody Bleyle's label Candy Ass Records and the bass guitarist Donna Dresch's label Chainsaw Records. The album's title and cover are a reference to the 1982 lesbian-themed film, Personal Best.

Reception

Johnny Histon of Spin praised the album's LGBT lyrical themes, writing that they had never been explored before in rock music. He concluded, "Team Dresch knows that simply being itself and making great music is a political act. On Personal Best they do both."

Retrospectively, Jason Ankeny of AllMusic declared the album a "call to arms" that "explodes on contact", writing, "Of all the punk records to come out of the 1990s, Personal Best comes closest to actually recapturing the sheer passion and rage which originally spawned the movement two decades earlier". He praised how the band "never put their politics ahead of their songs — each of these ten tracks is airtight, with melodies as blistering as the lyrics". The Washington Post writer Chris Richards called Personal Best "a fiery, all-but-forgotten punk masterpiece".

Track listing
 Fagetarian and Dyke – 2:45
 Hate the Christian Right! – 2:35
 She's Crushing My Mind – 1:42
 Freewheel – 1:39
 She's Amazing – 3:03
 Fake Fight – 3:07
 #1 Chance Pirate TV – 3:04
 D.A. Don't Care – 2:21
 Growing up in Springfield – 2:19
 Screwing Yer Courage – 1:39

Personnel
Credits are adapted from the album's liner notes.

 Donna Dresch  guitar, bass guitar
 Jody Bleyle  guitar, bass, vocals
 Kaia Wilson  guitar, vocals
 Marcéo Martinez  drums

References

External links

1995 albums
Candy Ass Records albums
Team Dresch albums